Side Streets is a 1933 British drama film directed by Ivar Campbell. It was made as a quota quickie at Shepperton Studios. The screenplay concerns a retired boxer who saves his fiancée's mother from her blackmailing husband.

Plot summary

Cast
 Jane Wood as Mrs. Brown  
 Diana Beaumont as Nancy Brown  
 Arnold Riches as Ted Swan 
 Paul Neville as Mr. Brown 
 Harry Terry (as unidentified character)
 Gunner Moir (as unidentified character)

References

Bibliography
 Wood, Linda. British Films, 1927–1939. British Film Institute, 1986.

External links
 

1933 films
1933 drama films
British drama films
Films set in England
Films shot at Shepperton Studios
Films directed by Ivar Campbell
British black-and-white films
1930s English-language films
1930s British films
Quota quickies